The Department of Productivity was an Australian government department with the mission to providing increased
industrial productivity. The department existed between November 1976 and November 1980, operating under the Fraser Government.

History
The establishment of the Department of Productivity was announced by Malcolm Fraser in November 1976, a new initiative taken to provide a technologically oriented agency with the responsibility of providing increased industrial productivity.

The Department of Productivity was abolished in November 1980 when the Fraser Government joined the department together with the Department of Science and the Environment to form the Department of Science and Technology, having received advice from the Australian Science and Technology Council that there would be merit in merging the two departments.

Outcomes and scope
The Department's mission was to provide increased industrial productivity.

Information about the department's functions and/or government funding allocation could be found in the Administrative Arrangements Orders, the annual Portfolio Budget Statements and in the department's annual reports.

At its creation, the Department dealt with:
Productivity of industry
Industrial training policy
Patents of Inventions and designs, and trade marks
Manufacture of goods and provision of services for defence purposes

Structure
The Department was an Australian Public Service department, staffed by officials responsible to the Minister for Productivity.

List of ministers

References

Ministries established in 1976
Productivity
Productivity organizations
Ministries disestablished in 1980